Walk Like a Dragon is a 1960 American Western film directed by James Clavell, written by James Clavell and Daniel Mainwaring, and starring Jack Lord, Nobu McCarthy, James Shigeta, Mel Tormé, Josephine Hutchinson, Rodolfo Acosta and Benson Fong. It was released on June 1, 1960, by Paramount Pictures.

The film has a retroactive connection to Clavell's later Asian Saga novels; the 1981 novel Noble House features a character named Lincoln Bartlett who is said to be a descendant of the similarly named character played by Jack Lord in this movie.

Plot
It is California during the 1870s. The cowboy Lincoln Bartlett, better known as 'Linc', comes to San Francisco and meets the Chinese Kim Sung at a slave fair, who is forced to work as a prostitute. To protect her from that environment, Linc decides to buy Kim for $750 in gold nuggets and let her live and work at his home. Linc's mother is not happy that a Chinese girl lives in their house and even less happy when Kim Sung and her son fall in love. Cheng Lu, a Chinese immigrant, is jealous and in order to take on Linc, he decides to take gunfighter lessons from 'The Deacon'.

Film's introduction:
California in the 1870s was rough and violent. Men were plentiful, but women were scarce. So girls were secretly and illegally imported from China, and sold as slaves. They were used, but scorned and isolated. This is a story of those times... It happened.

Cast 
Jack Lord as Lincoln "Linc" Bartlett
Nobu McCarthy as Kim Sung
James Shigeta as Cheng Lu
Mel Tormé as The Deacon
Josephine Hutchinson as Ma Bartlett
Rodolfo Acosta as Sheriff Marguelez 
Benson Fong as Wu
Michael Pate as Rev. Will Allen
Lilyan Chauvin as Mme. Lili Raide
Don Kennedy as Masters
Don "Red" Barry as Cabot 
Lester Matthews as Peter Mott
Michael Ross as Taffy
Charles Irwin as Angus
Tom Kennedy as Jethro the Bartender
Tony Young as Cabot
Natalie Trundy as Mrs. Susan Allen

Reception
The film received mixed reviews by critics.

References

External links 
 
 MUBI
 Rotten Tomatoes

1960 films
1960s English-language films
Paramount Pictures films
American Western (genre) films
1960 Western (genre) films
Films directed by James Clavell
Films with screenplays by James Clavell
Films scored by Paul Dunlap
Films about prejudice
Films about slavery
Films set in San Francisco
Films set in 1870
1960s American films